Auda, Aida, Alda, Aldana or Adalne (722 – before 755?) was wife of Frankish nobleman Thierry IV, count of Autun and mother of Saint William of Gellone.

Marriage and children 

She was married to Thierry IV, perhaps a nephew, grandson or grand-nephew of Bertrada of Prüm, in 742 and in 750. From this marriage were born:

 Theodoen (died before 826), count of Autun, mentioned in 804, whose son Thierry was active in the 810s.
 Adalhelm
 William, count of Toulouse and founder of the Abbey of Gellone.
 Abba and Berta, mentioned as nuns in 804. One of them was probably married to a Nibelungid, Childebrand II or Nibelung II.

722 births
8th-century deaths
Year of death uncertain
8th-century Frankish women